The General Service List (GSL) is a list of roughly 2,000 words published by Michael West in 1953. The words were selected to represent the most frequent words of English and were taken from a corpus of written English. The target audience was English language learners and ESL teachers. To maximize the utility of the list, some frequent words that overlapped broadly in meaning with words already on the list were omitted. In the original publication the relative frequencies of various senses of the words were also included.

Details
The list is important because a person who knows all the words on the list and their related families would understand approximately 90–95 percent of colloquial speech and 80–85 percent of common written texts. The list consists only of headwords, which means that the word "be" is high on the list, but assumes that the person is fluent in all forms of the word, e.g. am, is, are, was, were, being, and been.

Researchers have expressed doubts about the adequacy of the GSL because of its age and the relatively low coverage provided by the words not in the first 1,000 words of the list. Engels was, in particular, critical of the limited vocabulary chosen by West (1953), and while he concurred that the first 1,000 words of the GSL were good selections based on their high frequency and wide range, he was of the opinion that the words beyond the first 1,000 of the GSL could not be considered general service words because the range and frequency of these words were too low to be included in the list. Recent research by Billuroğlu and Neufeld (2005) confirmed that the General Service List was in need of minor revision, but the headwords in the list still provide approximately 80% text coverage in written English. The research showed that the GSL contains a small number of archaic terms, such as shilling, while excluding words that have gained currency since the first half of the twentieth century, such as plastic, television, battery, okay, victim, and drug.

The GSL evolved over several decades before West's publication in 1953. The GSL is not a list based solely on frequency, but includes groups of words on a semantic basis. Various versions float around the Internet, and attempts have been made to improve it.

There are two major updates of the GSL:
 the New General Service List (new-GSL) by Brezina & Gablasova, originally published in Applied Linguistics in 2013. This wordlist is based on the analysis of four language corpora of a total size of over 12 billion words.
 the New General Service List (NGSL), published in March 2013 by Browne, Culligan and Phillips. The NGSL was based on a 273 million-word subsection of the 2 billion-word Cambridge English Corpus. Preliminary results show that the new list provides a substantially higher degree of coverage with fewer words.

Some ESL dictionaries use the General Service List as their controlled defining vocabulary. In the Longman Dictionary of Contemporary English, each definition is written using the 2000-word Longman Defining Vocabulary based on the GSL.

See also
 New General Service List: a major update of the GSL which provides higher coverage with fewer words than the GSL, developed by Charles Browne, Brent Culligan and Joe Phillips
 International English
 Globish developed by Jean-Paul Nerrière
 Basic English developed by Charles Kay Ogden.
 Academic Word List developed as an extension to the General Service List by Averil Coxhead
 Swadesh list
 Dolch word list

Notes

References 

 Bauer, L. and Nation, I.S.P. (1993). Word families, International Journal of Lexicography 6, 3 (1993) 1-27.
 Billuroğlu, A. & Neufeld, S. (2005). The Bare Necessities in Lexis: a new perspective on vocabulary profiling. Retrieved September 2007 from http://lextutor.ca/vp/BNL_Rationale.doc
 Brezina, V. & Gablasova, D. (2013). Is There a Core General Vocabulary? Introducing the New General Service List. Applied Linguistics, retrieved 4 April 2014 from http://applij.oxfordjournals.org/content/early/2013/08/25/applin.amt018.abstract
 Dickins, J. (n.d.). Extended Version of Rank Frequency List: Spoken English, retrieved 3 December 2007 from http://www.languages.salford.ac.uk/staff/dickins.php.
 Engels, L.K. (1968). The fallacy of word counts. IRAL 6: 213–231. Retrieved August 2019 from https://www.degruyter.com/view/j/iral.1968.6.issue-1-4/iral.1968.6.1-4.213/iral.1968.6.1-4.213.xml
 Hancioglu, N., Neufeld, S., & Eldridge, J. (2008). Through the looking glass and into the land of lexico-grammar. English for Specific Purposes 27/4, 459-479 
 Nation, P., & Waring, R. (2004). Vocabulary size, text coverage and word lists. Retrieved September 2007 from https://web.archive.org/web/20080111133710/http://www.wordhacker.com/

External links 
 Bauman's revised GSL A 1995 revised version of the GSL with minor changes, along with a more detailed discussion about the problems in the GSL.
 PC-based vocabulary profiling software that includes the GSL:
 Heatley, Nation, and Coxhead's RANGE and FREQUENCY programs, including the GSL and the AWL as TXT files for vocabulary profiling
 Lextutor Vocabulary Profilers provided free by Tom Cobb includes several web-based vocabulary profilers, in which you can paste any text and the words are then 'coloured' according to frequency band profiles. Here are two:
 Classic Vocabulary Profiler, which produces output in coloured form—blue for K1 (the first 1,000 words of the GSL), green for K2 (the second 1,000 words of the GSL), yellow for Academic word list, and red for words that are not in any of the lists
 BNL profiler is a revised word list for students learning English which overcomes the problems of treating the GSL and AWL as separate and distinct constructs.
 Other web-based vocabulary profilers include:
 OGTE (Online Graded Text Editor) provided free by Charles Browne and Rob Waring. The tool allows teachers and authors to analyze and edit texts to a specific level using the GSL, NGSL, AWL and other important vocabulary lists.
 OKAPI will return formatted CBA probes or a readability analysis, with bands for Grades 1-3 (US) and Grades 4+
 WORDLE provides a graphic representation of words by frequency in any text, but is not as yet linked to any specific vocabulary profiling bands.

Lists of English words
Quantitative linguistics
Word lists